Prince Hulon Preston Jr. (July 5, 1908 – February 8, 1961) was an American politician, educator and lawyer.

Life 
Preston was born in Monroe, Georgia. He graduated from the University of Georgia School of Law in Athens and was admitted to the Georgia state bar in 1930.  He became a practicing lawyer in Statesboro, Georgia.

After serving in the Georgia House of Representatives from 1935 through 1938, Preston enlisted as a private in the United States Army in 1942 and was promoted through the ranks to captain by the time of his discharge on October 13, 1945. He was then elected as a judge for the Statesboro city courts; however, he also won election to the United States House of Representatives as a Democrat to serve in the 80th United States Congress and never took the bench.

A staunch segregationist, in 1956, Preston signed "The Southern Manifesto."

Preston was reelected for six additional terms before losing his reelection bid in 1960. He died the next year in Savannah, Georgia on February 8, 1961, and was buried in Stateboro's Eastside Cemetery.

References

1908 births
1961 deaths
American segregationists
Democratic Party members of the Georgia House of Representatives
Georgia (U.S. state) lawyers
United States Army officers
United States Army personnel of World War II
University of Georgia alumni
Democratic Party members of the United States House of Representatives from Georgia (U.S. state)
20th-century American politicians
People from Monroe, Georgia
Georgia (U.S. state) Dixiecrats
Military personnel from Georgia (U.S. state)
20th-century American lawyers